The Amritsar Singh Sabha, popularly known as Sanatan Singh Sabha, was founded in 1873, "It was essentially original and Sanatan ('eternal'). The Sanatan Sikh (a term and formulation coined by Harjot Oberoi) were the traditional Sikhs who were conquered and eventually marginalised.

They consider Khalsa as a sect of Sanatana Dharma.

Origin
The Sanatan Sikhs refer to the Classical Sikhism as Sikhs to be a wider denomination of Sanatana Dharma by the individual who practices karma and Bhakti of the Almighty in any way for the achievement of Moksha, or spiritual liberation. A second Singh Sabha was shaped and named the Tat Khalsa (`True` Khalsa) as a political reaction  to the formation of the Sanatan Singh Sabha. The Governing British Administration based at Lahore in 1879 founded the Tat khalsa. This Sabha was also called the Lahore Singh Sabha (Tat Khalsa Singh Sabha).

History
The British Raj utilized the Tat Khalsa Singh Sabha Sikhs to apply their `divide and rule` policy, which included a forced separation from its dharmic roots. The leader of Tat Khalsa Singh Sabha was Bhai Gurmukh Singh,  a professor and co-sponsor at the Oriental College of Lahore. Bhai Gurmukh Singh cooperated with Max Arthur Macauliffe, a divisional judge, to undertake the translation of Granth Sahib (finished in 1909). The western educated Sikh reformers, went onto write Mahan Kosh (encyclopedia of Sikhism) and Ham Hindu Nahin (We are not Hindus), with a policy to dilute the Sanatana heritage and make Sikhism more in line with the wants of the British administration. "The British established the current Tat Khalsa Singh Sabha which reflected the views and interests of an emerging Western educated vernacular elite, including men such as Gurmukh Singh, the co-sponsor of the Lahore Singh Sabha a professor at Oriental college",  On the issue of Diet the directive of the The British administered Tat Khalsa Singh Sabha to dilute issues such as cow protection, and the value of vegetarian lifestyle within Sikhism had now been effectively erased. However historical Sikh figures such as Maharaja Ranjit Singh, banned Cow slaughter throughout his kingdom.  “The British Raj, applies the Tat Khalsa Singh Sabha Sikhs to apply their divide and rule policy which sought to negate the original Sanatan Sikhism in the name of “reform” whereas sanatan Sikhism was inclusive, the British created Tat Khalsa Singh Sabha is not”

See Also
 Baba Khem Singh Bedi
 Singh Sabha movement

Notes

Sikh groups and sects
Singh Sabha movement